Specialist may refer to:

Occupations
 Specialist (rank), a military rank
 Specialist (Singapore)
 Specialist law enforcement agency
 Specialist (arena football)
 Specialist degree, in academia
 Specialty (medicine)
 Designated market maker, in the American stock market
 Payload specialist, a Space Shuttle crew member with duties associated with a flight's payload

Arts and entertainment
 "Specialist" (short story), a 1953 science fiction story by Robert Sheckley
 Specialist (TV series), a 2016 Japanese drama
 "Specialist", a song by Interpol from Turn On the Bright Lights
 The Specialist (1975 film), an American thriller film
 The Specialist, a 1994 American action film
 The Specialist (comics) (Lo Sconosciuto), an Italian comic
 The Specialist, a book by Charles "Chic" Sale

Other uses
 Specialist (computer), a Soviet DIY computer design
 Specialist species, a species that thrives best in a particular habitat, or has a limited diet
 Specialists' Shopping Centre, Singapore
Specialist status, a status given to schools in the United Kingdom

See also
 Specialization (disambiguation)
 Special adviser (disambiguation)
 The Specialists (disambiguation)